Rise Artists Studio is a training and management subsidiary of ABS-CBN Films, in collaboration with Star Magic. It is responsible for scouting and developing aspiring artists, as well as maintaining the stardom of the artists it handles.

On February 6, 2020, Rise Artists Studio introduced the first batch of artists under its management, with 11 artists originally from Star Magic and two from Star Hunt.

Artists

Batch 1

Batch 2

Batch 3

Former artists

Rise iHub

On September 9, 2020, Rise Artists Studio launched Rise iHub for content creators. It will feature collaborations of content creators to a diverse audience.

Shows and Contents

We Rise Together aired on Kapamilya Channel and Kapamilya Online Live under Yes Weekend! block from May 30, 2021 to January 30, 2022 replacing Lucky Tulong on Sunday afternoon block and from February 5, 2022 to April 2, 2022 replacing Uncoupling on Saturday afternoon block. It was replaced by Rated Korina in its timeslot.

Boys After Dark is a video podcast featuring men of Rise Artist and RiseiHub, Markus Paterson, Anthony Jennings, Aljon Mendoza, Gello Marquez and Jae Miranda as they tackle about lifestyle, relationships and other locker room conversations in a no-holds-barred way.  

Plate Twists is a cooking show featuring Rise ladies Gillian Vicencio and Bianca de Vera as they create easy-to-cook and budget-friendly meals for family, friends or self for different moods or occasions, while they also discuss topics about relationships, emotions and everything in between. 

Rise with You is a two-part episode variety show with sing and dance performances, acting and games featuring Rise Artist Studio and Rise iHub talents, with the participation of some Kapamilya artists as guests. It premiered in iWant TFC on January 25, 2023, and was shown in Kapamilya Channel, Kapamilya Online Live and A2Z on. February 25-26, 2023.

See also
Star Magic
Sparkle GMA Artist Center

Notes

References

2020 establishments in the Philippines
Talent agencies of the Philippines
Assets owned by ABS-CBN Corporation